Edward Bagot may refer to:

 Alec Bagot (Edward Daniel Alexander Bagot, 1893–1968), member of the South Australian Legislative Council
 Sir Edward Bagot, 2nd Baronet (1616–1673), English landowner and politician
 Sir Edward Bagot, 4th Baronet (1674–1712), English politician
 Edward Meade Bagot (1822–1886), pastoralist and developer in Central Australia